Tzufit Grant (also spelled Tzofit; , born 13 November 1964) is an Israeli actress and former host of the television show Milkshake. She was born in Petah Tikva, Israel.

Career
Grant has acted in several TV shows and films, among them Matok VeMar and Distortion.

In 2011 she started hosting a television documentary series called Lost (Hebrew: אבודים), which helps reunite family members that have lost contact with one another, including adopted children and their biological parents. The show often involves international travel and ends with dramatic revelations.

Personal life
Grant was married to Avram Grant and they have a son and daughter.
Since 2020, she has been in a relationship with singer and creator Shuli Rand and the two were married on November 9, 2021.

References

External links

1964 births
Living people
Beit Zvi School for the Performing Arts alumni
Israeli film actresses
Israeli Jews
Israeli television actresses
People from Petah Tikva